The following entries cover events related to the study of philosophy which occurred in the listed year or century.

Centuries
11th century in philosophy
12th century in philosophy
13th century in philosophy
14th century in philosophy
15th century in philosophy
16th century in philosophy
17th century in philosophy
18th century in philosophy
19th century in philosophy
20th century in philosophy
21st-century    philosophy

Pre 1800
1623 1658 
1700 1743 1748 1751 1776 1781 1798

1800s
1800 1801 1809 1820 1828 1838 1844  1845 1847 1848 1854 1855 1859 1860 1861 1872 1889 1890 1898 1899

1900s
1900   1901   1902   1903   1904   1905   1906   1907   1908   1909
1910   1911   1912   1913   1914   1915   1916   1917   1918   1919
1920   1921   1922   1923   1924   1925   1926   1927   1928   1929
1930   1931   1932   1933   1934   1935   1936   1937   1938   1939
1940   1941   1942   1943   1944   1945   1946   1947   1948   1949
1950   1951   1952   1953   1954   1955   1956   1957   1958   1959
1960   1961   1962   1963   1964   1965   1966   1967   1968   1969
1970   1971   1972   1973   1974   1975   1976   1977   1978   1979
1980   1981   1982   1983   1984   1985   1986   1987   1988   1989
1990   1991   1992   1993   1994   1995   1996   1997   1998   1999

2000s
2000   2001   2002   2003   2004   2005
2006   2007   2008   2009
2010   2011   2012   2013   2014   2015   2016   2017   2018   20192020   2021 2022 2023

See also
 Timeline of philosophers
 List of years in science
 List of years in literature
 List of years in art

Please see the WikiProject page for formatting standards.

Year
Philosophy
Philosophy